Viktor Petrovich Dubynin was a prominent Soviet and Russian military figure, an Army General, and a Hero of the Russian Federation (posthumously).

Born in 1943, Viktor Dubynin had been in service with the Soviet Army since 1961. In 1964 he graduated from the Far Eastern Tank Academy, then from the Rodion Malinovsky Armored Forces Academy in 1978, and finally from the General Staff Academy in 1984.

From 1986 to 1987 he served as commander of the Soviet 40th Army in Afghanistan.

From 1989 to 1992 he was the (penultimate) commander of the Soviet Northern Group of Forces in Poland.

On 10 June 1992, Dubynin was appointed by President Boris Yeltsin as Chief of the General Staff of the Armed Forces of the Russian Federation. On the 5 October, he became Russia's first General of the Army since the Collapse of the Soviet Union. At that moment Dubynin was already suffering from terminal cancer, so the then-Minister of Defense Pavel Grachev had to visit him at his hospital ward in order to hand Dubynin's shoulder boards over to him.

Dubynin died on 22 November 1992 after his long struggle with cancer. His grave is at Novodevichy cemetery in Moscow.

References

1943 births
1992 deaths
Burials at Novodevichy Cemetery
Generals of the army (Russia)
Soviet colonel generals
Soviet military personnel of the Soviet–Afghan War
Military Academy of the General Staff of the Armed Forces of the Soviet Union alumni
Heroes of the Russian Federation
Deaths from cancer in Russia
Deputy Defence Ministers of Russia